Juan Carlos Castillo (19 August 1964 – 25 November 1993) was a Colombian racing cyclist. He rode in two editions of the Tour de France. He was shot dead in his car in Colombia.

Major results
1984
 1st  Overall Vuelta de la Juventud de Colombia
1985
 1st Stage 5 Vuelta al Ecuador

Grand Tour general classification results timeline

References

External links
 

1964 births
1993 deaths
Colombian male cyclists
People from Manizales
Deaths by firearm in Colombia
Male murder victims
People murdered in Colombia
20th-century Colombian people